Loose Tubes is the debut album by English jazz Loose Tubes. It was released in 1985 as an LP on Loose Tubes Limited. The recording has never been reissued on CD.

Track listing
 "Eden Express" (Django Bates) – 8:15 
 "Rowing Boat Delineation Egg" (Bates) – 3:55
 "Descarga" (Dave Pattman, John Parricelli, Steve Berry) – 8:00
 "Descarga Ocurriencia" (Berry) – 2:43
 "Yellow Hill" (Bates) – 6:01
 "Mister Zee" (Berry) – 7:08
 "Arriving" (Chris Batchelor) – 4:22

Notes
Tracks 1, 2, 5, 6 & 7 recorded at Portland Studios, London 29/12/84 
Tracks 3 & 4 recorded at Lansdowne Studios, London 15/9/85

Personnel

Iain Ballamy – alto & soprano saxophones (soloist: track 5)
Steve Buckley – alto & soprano saxophones
Mark Lockheart – tenor saxophone (soloist: track 1)
Tim Whitehead – tenor saxophone (soloist: track 6)
Dave Bitelli – baritone saxophone (tracks 1, 2, 5, 6 & 7)
Howard Turner – baritone saxophone (tracks 3 & 4)
Dai Pritchard – clarinet & bass clarinet
Eddie Parker – flute
David DeFries – trumpet (soloist: track 3)
John Eacott – trumpet
Chris Batchelor – trumpet
Lance Kelly – trumpet (tracks 1, 2, 5, 6 & 7)
Steve Waterman – trumpet (tracks 3 & 4)
John Harborne – trombone (soloist: track 3)
Steve Day – trombone 
Richard Pywell – trombone
Ashley Slater – bass trombone 
Dave Powell – tuba
Django Bates – keyboards, melodica (soloist: tracks 1, 6 and 7)
John Parricelli – electric guitar (soloist: track 4)
Steve Berry – double bass
Nic France – drums, electric drums
Steve Argüelles – percussion
Colin Lazzerini – bass telephone, typewriter & rabbit

References

1985 debut albums
Loose Tubes albums